Bertrand Daille (born 11 October 1971 in Chambéry) is a French slalom canoeist.

Career
Daille competed from the late 1980s to the late 1990s. He won seven medals at the ICF Canoe Slalom World Championships with a gold (C2 team: 1997), three silvers (C2: 1993; C2 team: 1993, 1995) and three bronzes (C2: 1995, 1999; C2 team: 1999).

He also won a bronze medal in the C2 team event at the 1998 European Championships in Roudnice nad Labem.

Daille also finished 11th in the C2 event at the 1992 Summer Olympics in Barcelona.

His partner in the boat for most of his active career was Éric Biau.

World Cup individual podiums

References
ICF medalists for Olympic and World Championships - Part 2: rest of flatwater (now sprint) and remaining canoeing disciplines: 1936-2007.

1971 births
Canoeists at the 1992 Summer Olympics
French male canoeists
Living people
Olympic canoeists of France
Medalists at the ICF Canoe Slalom World Championships
Sportspeople from Chambéry